Cordillera Province may refer to:

Cordillera Province, Bolivia
Cordillera Province, Chile

See also 
 Cordillera

Province name disambiguation pages